The 2015–16 West Virginia Mountaineers women's basketball team will represent West Virginia University during the 2015–16 NCAA Division I women's basketball season. The Mountaineers are coached by fifteenth year head coach Mike Carey and play their home games at WVU Coliseum and were members of the Big 12 Conference. They finished with a record of 25–10, 12–6 in Big 12 play to finish in third place. They advanced to the semifinals of the Big 12 women's tournament where they lost to Texas. They received an at-large bid to the NCAA women's tournament where they defeated Princeton in the first round before losing to Ohio State in the second round.

Roster

Schedule

|-
!colspan=12 style="background:#EEB211; color:#00457C;"| Exhibition

|-
!colspan=12 style="background:#EEB211; color:#00457C;"| Non-Conference Games

|-
!colspan=9 style="background:#EEB211; color:#00457C;"| Conference Games

|-
!colspan=9 style="background:#EEB211; color:#00457C;" | Big 12 Women's Tournament

|-
!colspan=9 style="background:#EEB211; color:#00457C;" | NCAA Women's Tournament

Rankings
2015–16 NCAA Division I women's basketball rankings

See also
 2015–16 West Virginia Mountaineers men's basketball team

References

West Virginia Mountaineers women's basketball
West Virginia
West Virginia Mountaineers women's b
West Virginia Mountaineers women's b
West Virginia